The men's freestyle light heavyweight competition at the 1936 Summer Olympics in Berlin took place from 3 August to 4 August at the Deutschlandhalle. Nations were limited to one competitor. This weight class was limited to wrestlers weighing up to 87kg.

This freestyle wrestling competition continued to use the "bad points" elimination system introduced at the 1928 Summer Olympics for Greco-Roman and at the 1932 Summer Olympics for freestyle wrestling, with a slight modification. Each round featured all wrestlers pairing off and wrestling one bout (with one wrestler having a bye if there were an odd number). The loser received 3 points if the loss was by fall or unanimous decision and 2 points if the decision was 2-1 (this was the modification from prior years, where all losses were 3 points). The winner received 1 point if the win was by decision and 0 points if the win was by fall. At the end of each round, any wrestler with at least 5 points was eliminated.

Schedule

Results

Round 1

Of the winners, two won by fall and advanced with 0 points while four won by decision and moved to the second round with 1 point. All six losers received 3 points for defeats by fall or unanimous decision.

 Bouts

 Points

Round 2

Clemons and Siebert were the best wrestlers through the first two rounds, each with 1 point for a win by decision and a win by fall. Fridell was also 2–0, but both wins were by decision and he had 2 points. Scarf finished the round at 2 points as well, with a 1–1 record (win by fall, loss by split decision). Six other wrestlers had a 1–1 record and finished the round with 3 or 4 points. Three had lost both the first two rounds and were eliminated.

 Bouts

 Points

Round 3

Clemons fell from first to fifth with a loss to Neo. Siebert picked up a second point but stayed in the lead along with Fridell. Dätwyler and Neo had 3 points apiece after the third round. The three losers other than Clemons were eliminated, as was Avcioglu, who withdrew.

 Bouts

 Points

Round 4

Dätwyler and Clemons were eliminated with losses, leaving three wrestlers in competition. Fridell and Siebert each stayed at 2 points, winning by fall and having a bye, respectively. Neo received his fourth point in the win by decision.

 Bouts

 Points

Round 5

Fridell had previously defeated Neo, but Siebert had not faced either other wrestler. Fridell received the bye in this round, with Neo and Siebert wrestling. Had Siebert earned fewer than 3 points in the round, another bout would have been contested with Fridell and Siebert facing off. However, Neo defeated Siebert by unanimous decision. This put both wrestlers at 5 points—Neo adding 1 point to his starting 4 and Siebert adding 3 to his 2. Neo earned silver based on the head-to-head result in this round breaking the tie. Fridell won the gold medal.

 Bouts

 Points

References

Wrestling at the 1936 Summer Olympics